Count Emil Dessewffy de Csernek et Tarkeő (24 February 1814, Eperjes – 10 January 1866, Pozsony) was a Hungarian conservative politician, leader of the Conservative Party, who served as President of the Hungarian Academy of Sciences from 1855 until his death.

References 
Szinnyei, József: Magyar írók élete és munkái II. (Caban–Exner). Budapest: Hornyánszky. 1893.

1814 births
1866 deaths
Hungarian politicians
Hungarian nobility
Emil
Members of the Hungarian Academy of Sciences